Indigenous Australians are the original inhabitants of the Australian continent and nearby islands. The Torres Strait Islanders are indigenous to the Torres Strait Islands, which are at the northernmost tip of Queensland near Papua New Guinea. The term "Aboriginal" has traditionally been applied to indigenous inhabitants of mainland Australia, Tasmania, and some of the other adjacent islands. Since the colonisation of Australia in 1788, indigenous Australians have been segregated from European Australians both in their rights and socially within society. The 'firsts' listed in this article contain historical steps that have changed this initial racist segregation both legally and culturally.

17th century

1600s
 1606
 First known meeting between Indigenous Australians and Europeans (Mapoon, Queensland).

18th century

1780s
 1788
 First Indigenous Australian to live amongst Europeans: Arabanoo.

1790s
 1793
 First Indigenous Australian song performed in Europe: Bennelong, Yemmerrawanne.
 1796
 First Indigenous Australian to appear in print: Bennelong (see also 1949).

19th century

1800s
 1802
 First Indigenous Australian to circumnavigate Australia: Bungaree.

1810s
 1815
 First Indigenous Australian to be granted land by the colonial authorities: Bungaree.

1820s

1830s
 1835
 First Indigenous Australian to be recorded playing western sport: Shiney (cricket in Hobart).
 1836
 First publication solely written and published by Indigenous Australians: Flinders Island Chronicle (twenty-nine editions published).

1840s

1850s
 1856
 Indigenous Australian males first given the right to vote in elections (South Australia).

1860s
 1864
 First time portions of the Bible published in an Indigenous Australian language (Ngarrindjeri).
 1868
 First Australian cricket team to tour overseas and the first sporting team to represent Australia abroad, is composed of Australian Aboriginal people.

1870s
 1870
 First Indigenous Australian to play first-class cricket: Twopenny.
 1871
 First Indigenous Australian to become a deacon: James Unaipon.
 1872
 1874
 1875
 1876
 1877
 1879

1880s
 1880
 1881
 1883
 First Indigenous Australian to win the Stawell Gift: Bobby Kinnear.
 1884
 
 1885
 
 1886
 1887
 1888
 1889
 First Indigenous Australian to play in a major Australian rules football league, South Australian Football Association (now SANFL): Harry Hewitt.

1890s
 1891
 1892
 1893
 First Indigenous Australian to play representative rugby union: Frank Ivory (Queensland).
 1895
 Indigenous Australian women first gain the right to vote in elections (South Australia).
 1896
 1897
First translation of the New Testament into an Indigenous Australian language (Dieri).
 1899
 First Indigenous Australian to be recorded: Fanny Cochrane Smith.

20th century

1900s
 1900
 First Indigenous Australian to regularly play in a major Australian rules football league, West Australian Football Association (now WAFL): Jimmy Melbourne.
 1901
 1902
 1903
 1904
 First Indigenous Australian to play in the Victorian Football League (VFL): Joe Johnson.
 1906
 1907
 1908
 1909
 First Indigenous Australian to play first-grade level rugby league: George Green.

1910s
 1910
 1911
 1912
 First Indigenous Australian to win a national boxing title: Jerry Jerome (middleweight).
 First Indigenous Australian to be awarded a medal for gallantry: Neighbour (Albert Medal). 
 1915
 1916
 First Indigenous Australian to be awarded the Military Medal in World War I : Maitland Madge.
 1917
 1919
 First Torres Strait Islanders to be ordained deacons in the Anglican Church of Australia (then called the Church of England in Australia): Joseph Lui and Poey Passi.

1920s
 1920
 1921
 1924
 1925
 First Indigenous Australian to tour abroad as part of open sporting team: Glen Crouch (Queensland rugby league team to New Zealand).
 First Aboriginal Australian to be ordained deacon in the Anglican Church of Australia (then called the Church of England in Australia): James Noble (clergyman). 
 First Torres Strait Islanders to be ordained priests in the Anglican Church of Australia (then called the Church of England in Australia): Joseph Lui and Poey Passi. 
 1926
 1927
 First Indigenous Australian to have a book published: David Unaipon (Aboriginal Legends).
 1928
 1929
 First Indigenous Australian to win the World Professional Sprint Championship: Lynch Cooper.

1930s
 1931
 1932
 First literary writing in Indigenous Australian vernacular: Sam Dintibana, in Dieri. 
 1934
 1935
 First Indigenous Australian to be selected in the Victorian interstate Australian rules team: Doug Nicholls. 
 1936
 1937
 1938
 First major national Indigenous day of protest: Australia Day protest by the Aborigines Progressive Association. 
 1939
 First mass strike of Indigenous Australians: Cummeragunja walk-off.

1940s
 1940
 1941
 1942
 1943
 1944
 First Indigenous Australian to be commissioned as an officer in the Australian armed forces: Reg Saunders.
 First Indigenous military aviator: Len Waters.
 1945
 1947
 1948
 1949
 First federal electorate named after an Indigenous Australian: Division of Bennelong, named in honour of Bennelong.

1950s
 1950
 The first named Indigenous Australian to appear on an Australian stamp: Gwoya Jungarai.
 1952
 1953
 1954
 First Indigenous nurse in South Australia: Lois (Lowitja) O’Donoghue 
 First Indigenous Railway Station Master
 1955
 1956
 1957
 First Indigenous Australian to become an Australian citizen: Albert Namatjira. 
 First Indigenous Australian to enrol in university: Margaret Williams-Weir.
 1958
 First Indigenous Australian woman to be selected for a national sporting side: Faith Coulthard (cricket).
 First song written and recorded by Indigenous Australians: "Give the Coloured Boy a Chance" (written by Jimmy Little, Snr and recorded by Jimmy Little).
 1959
 First Indigenous Australian entertainer to appear on television: Jimmy Little.
 First Indigenous Australian to gain a university qualification: Margaret Williams-Weir.

1960s
 1960
 First Indigenous Australian to compete at the Paralympics: Kevin Coombes.
 First Indigenous Australian to represent Australia in rugby league: Lionel Morgan.
 1961
 First Indigenous Australian to win the Bay Sheffield: Ken Hampton.
 First Indigenous Australians to represent Australia in basketball: Bennie Lew Fatt and John Bonson.
 1962
 First Indigenous Australian to win a Gold Medal at the Commonwealth Games: Jeff Dynevor (Bantamweight boxing).
 First Indigenous Australian to release an album: Georgia Lee (Georgia Lee Sings the Blues Down Under).
 First Indigenous Australian to represent Australia in rugby union: Lloyd McDermott.
 Indigenous Australians first given right to enrol to vote in Australian federal elections.
 Indigenous Australians first given right to enrol to vote in Northern Territory elections.
 1963
 First time Indigenous Australians legally allowed to drink alcohol in New South Wales (30 March). 
 First Indigenous Australian to have a number one hit on the Australian music charts: Jimmy Little ("Royal Telephone").
 First documentary recognition of Indigenous Australians in Australian law: Yirrkala bark petitions. 
 1964
 First Indigenous Australian to publish a book of verse: Oodgeroo Noonuccal (We Are Going).
 First Indigenous Australians to compete in an Olympic Games: Michael Ah Matt, Adrian Blair and Frank Roberts.
 1965
 First Indigenous Australian police officer: Colin Dillon.
 Indigenous Australians first given right to vote in Queensland elections.
 First all-Indigenous Australian contemporary music concert held in Sydney.
 First novel by an Indigenous Australian author to be published in Australia: Wild Cat Falling by Mudrooroo
 1966
 First Indigenous Australian university degree graduates: Charles Perkins (see also 1984) and Margaret Valadian. 
 First Indigenous Australian to be ordained as a Minister of the Methodist Church: Lazarus Lamilami.
 1967
 Indigenous Australians allowed to be counted in the Australian census (the first census to include Indigenous Australians was 1971). 
 1968
 First Indigenous Australian to become world champion (bantamweight boxing): Lionel Rose.
 First Indigenous Australian to be named Australian of the Year: Lionel Rose
 First Indigenous Australian to compete internationally in wrestling: John Kinsella.
 First Indigenous Australian to become a state champion cyclist: Brian Mansell (Tasmania).
 1969
 First Indigenous Australian to play List A cricket: Ian King.
 First legal challenge for Aboriginal title to land: Milirrpum v Nabalco.

1970s
 1970
 First Indigenous Australian to play soccer for Australia: Harry Williams.
 First Aboriginal Australian to be ordained priest in the Anglican Church of Australia (then called the Church of England in Australia): Patrick Brisbane. 
 1971
 First indigenous Australian to sit in the Parliament of Australia: Neville Bonner.
 First play written by an Indigenous Australian performed in mainstream theatre: The Cherry Pickers by Kevin Gilbert.
 First Indigenous Australian to win a Grand Slam tennis event (French Open): Evonne Goolagong.
 First Australian rules footballer to be honoured with an MBE: Graham Farmer.
 Australian Aboriginal Flag first flown in public (designed by Harold Thomas, the flag was flown in Victoria Square, Adelaide on National Aborigines Day, 12 July).
 1972
 First Indigenous Australian theatre company formed: "Nindethana" (founded by Jack Charles and Bob Maza).
 First Indigenous Australian-produced community radio programs went to air (5UV in Adelaide and at the Townsville Aboriginal and Islander Media Association (TAIMA) at Mount Stuart, south of Townsville, on 4KIG FM2).
 First Indigenous Australian representative Australian rules team to play overseas (Papua New Guinea).
 First film made by an Indigenous Australian (Blackfire, by Bruce McGuinness and Martin Bartfeld).
 First Indigenous Australian to receive a knighthood (Douglas Nicholls).
 1973
 First Indigenous Australian jockey to win the Melbourne Cup: Frank Reys.
 First Indigenous Australian to captain Australia: Arthur Beetson (Rugby League).
 First television show with an all-Aboriginal cast (Basically Black).
 1974
 First Indigenous Australian elected to a state or territory parliament: Hyacinth Tungutalum. 
 1975
 First Indigenous Australian to be employed in Australia's tertiary education sector as a lecturer: Maryann Bin-Salik.
 1976
 First Indigenous Australian to hold vice-regal office (Governor of South Australia): Sir Douglas Nicholls.
 First Indigenous Australian to be appointed a Justice of the Peace in South Australia: Ken Hampton (see also 1961).
First Indigenous Australian Barrister: Patricia O’Shane 
First Indigenous Australian woman to be awarded an Order of Australia: Lois (Lowitja) O’Donoghue 
 1977
 First Indigenous Australian to hold a shadow portfolio in a federal, state or territory parliament: Neville Perkins (Northern Territory).
 First Indigenous Australian to referee a world title boxing match: Trevor Christian.
 First city council to fly the Aboriginal flag (Newcastle City Council).
 1978
 1979
 First Indigenous Australian to represent Australia in volleyball: Mark Tutton.
First woman to be appointed to the New South Wales Metropolitan Water, Sewerage and Drainage Board. Patricia O'Shane 
First Indigenous Principal in Western Australia after being promoted to Principal Class II of Wiluna Special Aboriginal School: Len Hayward

1980s
 1980
 First Indigenous Australian to receive a PhD: Bill Jonas.
 First Indigenous Australian to officially address the United Nations: Jim Hagan.
 1981
 First boxer to become Australian titleholder in four weight divisions: Tony Mundine.
 First feature film starring all-Indigenous Australian cast: Wrong Side of the Road. 
First Aboriginal person and first woman to become a permanent head of ministry in Australia: Patricia O'Shane
 1982
 First Indigenous Australian woman to gain a private pilot's licence: Virginia Wykes.
 First Indigenous Australian man to play at Wimbledon: Ian Goolagong (mixed doubles with sister Evonne).
 First Indigenous Australian to win the Norm Smith Medal: Maurice Rioli.
 First Indigenous Australian to head a state government department (New South Wales Department of Aboriginal Affairs): Pat O'Shane. 
 1983
 First Indigenous Australian to become a medical doctor: Dr Helen Milroy.
 1984
 First Indigenous Australian to become permanent head of a federal government department (Department of Aboriginal Affairs): Charles Perkins. (see also 1966)
 1985
 First Indigenous Australian television station commences: Channel 4 Yuendumu.
 First Indigenous Australian bishop of the Anglican Church of Australia: Arthur Malcolm.
 1986
 First Indigenous Australian Minister of the Crown: Ernie Bridge (Western Australia). 
 First Indigenous Australian to represent Australia in netball: Marcia Ella-Duncan.
 1987
 First Indigenous Australian psychologist: Pat Dudgeon. 
 1988
 1989
 First Indigenous Australian to win the Magarey Medal: Gilbert McAdam.

1990s
 1990
 First Indigenous Australian to win an international track medal (bronze, 4 × 400 m relay, 1990 Commonwealth Games): Cathy Freeman (see also 1992 and 2000). 
 First Indigenous Australian rock opera: Bran Nue Dae.
 1991
 First Indigenous Australian woman to represent Australia in hockey: Lorelle Morrissey.
 1992
 First Indigenous Australian woman to be selected in the Olympic Games: Cathy Freeman (see also 1990 and 2000).
 The Torres Strait Islander Flag is flown for the first time.
 1993
 First Indigenous Australian to win a Brownlow Medal: Gavin Wanganeen.
1994
 First Indigenous Australian to be appointed a university Chancellor: Pat O'Shane (University of New England).
 1995
First Indigenous Australian to graduate as a veterinary surgeon: Joe Schmidt.
 1996
 First Indigenous Australian to win a Gold Medal at the Olympic Games: Nova Peris (hockey).
 First Indigenous Australian to play Test cricket: Jason Gillespie.
 First Indigenous Australian male to represent Australia in hockey: Baeden Choppy.
 First Indigenous Australian to be appointed a judge: Bob Bellear.
 1997
First Indigenous performing arts centre: Aboriginal Centre for the Performing Arts (ACPA) 
 First Indigenous Australian elected to the International Rugby Hall of Fame: Mark Ella.
 1998
 1999
 First Indigenous Australian to become Miss Australia: Kathryn Hay.
 2000
 First Indigenous Australian to win an individual Olympic gold medal (400m, 2000 Summer Olympics): Cathy Freeman (see also 1990 and 1992).

21st century

2000s
 2001
 First Indigenous Australian woman elected to an Australian parliament: Carol Martin. 
 2002
 2003
 First Indigenous Australian woman Minister of the Crown: Marion Scrymgour.
 First Indigenous Nurse Practitioner Australia: Lesley Salem
First Indigenous medical practitioner to be awarded a Doctorate of Philosophy: Sandra Eades.
 2004
 2005
 2006
 First Indigenous Australian surgeon: Kelvin Kong.
 2007
 2008
 First Indigenous Australian to play in the National Basketball Association (NBA): Nathan Jawai.
 2009
 First Indigenous Australian woman to become an Anglican remote area priest: Yulki Nunggumajbarr.

2010s
 2010
 First Indigenous Australian woman elected to a United Nations body: Megan Davis (Permanent Forum on Indigenous Issues).
 First Indigenous Australians to set foot on Antarctica: Narelle Long and Malcolm Lynch.
 First Indigenous Australian to play international Twenty20 cricket: Dan Christian (Australia vs West Indies). 
 First Indigenous Australian elected to the Australian House of Representatives: Ken Wyatt.
 2011
 First Indigenous Australian Rhodes Scholar: Rebecca Richards.
 2012
 First Indigenous Australian woman archdeacon in the Anglican Church: Karen Kime.
 First Indigenous Australian to join golf's PGA Tour: Scott Gardiner.
 First Indigenous Australian to study at the University of Cambridge: Lilly Brown.
 First Indigenous Australian appointed to a federal court: Matthew Myers. 
 2013
 First Indigenous Australian to become a head of government: Adam Giles (Northern Territory).
 First Indigenous Australian appointed as head of an overseas mission: Damien Miller (Denmark).
 First time Aboriginal flag flown over an overseas military base (Al Minhad Air Base, United Arab Emirates).
 First Indigenous Australian woman elected to Australian parliament: Nova Peris.
 2015
 First Indigenous Australian woman elected to the Queensland Parliament: Leeanne Enoch.
 First Indigenous Australian to be appointed a federal frontbench minister: Ken Wyatt.
 First Indigenous Australian to become a Queen's Counsel: Tony McAvoy.
First Indigenous Australian woman to be ordained to Christian ministry in South Australia: Denise Mary Champion
 2016
First Indigenous Australian woman elected to Australian House of Representatives: Linda Burney.
First Indigenous Australian to win the X Factor: Isaiah Firebrace.
2017
 First Indigenous Australian to be appointed a minister in the Commonwealth Government: Ken Wyatt (Minister for Indigenous Health).
2018
 First Indigenous Australian to compete in a Winter Olympics: Harley Windsor (Figure skating).
2019
Twelve year old Indigenous Australian Dujuan Hoosan becomes the youngest person to address the UN Human Rights Council.

2020s
2020
 First Indigenous Australian to win AFLW Best and Fairest: Madison Prespakis.

Notes

References
 Australian Indigenous Doctors' Association (2009), Journeys into Medicine, AIDA: Sydney. .
 Gale, M-A. (1997) Dhanum Djorra'wuy Dhawu, Aboriginal Research Institute: Underdale. .
 McMillan, A. (2007) An Intruder's Guide to East Arnhem Land, Niblock Publishing: Darwin. .
 Rolfe, C. (2009) Winners of the Melbourne Cup: Stories That Stopped a Nation, Red Dog Books: Sydney. .
 Screen Australia (2010) The Black List, Screen Australia: Sydney. .
 Tatz, C. & Tatz, P. (1996) Black Diamonds, Allen & Unwin: Sydney. .
 Tatz, C. & Tatz, P. (2000) Black Gold, Aboriginal Studies Press: Canberra. .

Lists of firsts
Firsts